Barbara Follett may refer to:
Barbara Follett (politician) (born 1942), British Labour Party politician
Barbara Newhall Follett (1914–?), American child prodigy novelist